Christine C. G. Hogarth  is a Canadian politician, who was elected to the Legislative Assembly of Ontario in the 2018 provincial election. She represents the electoral district of Etobicoke—Lakeshore as a member of the Progressive Conservative Party, for which she previously served as Ontario executive director.

Early life and education
Hogarth has a bachelor of science degree in political science and public administration. She is the daughter of Marlene Hogarth and William Donald Hogarth, who served as a municipal councillor in Shuniah.

Career
Hogarth was chief of staff to John Tory when he headed the Progressive Conservative Party of Ontario. She was twice elected to the party executive and served as its first female executive director and held two elected positions on the party executive. Hogarth was policy adviser to Chris Hodgson when he was Minister of Northern Development and Mines, Minister of Natural Resources and Chair of Management Board of Cabinet. Hogarth also worked for two Ontario Premiers. She worked as the Director of Events for the Toronto Board of Trade and as a government relations manager with the Canadian Automobile Association. Within government, she was the Queen's Park staffer in Patrick Brown's office, an executive assistant to the Ward 4 Councillor John Campbell in Etobicoke, and from 2011 to 2014 chief of staff for the mayor of Greater Sudbury, Marianne Matichuk.

In 2017 she declared her candidacy for the Etobicoke—Lakeshore seat in the Legislative Assembly of Ontario, against the incumbent, Peter Milczyn. She received the endorsement of Patrick Brown, then-leader the Ontario Progressive Conservative Party.

On June 29, 2018, Hogarth was appointed as Parliamentary Assistant to the Minister of Municipal Affairs and Housing, with a responsibility for the Housing portfolio.

She was re-elected in the 2022 Ontario general election.

Election results

References

Living people
Year of birth missing (living people)
21st-century Canadian politicians
21st-century Canadian women politicians
Progressive Conservative Party of Ontario MPPs
Women MPPs in Ontario
People from Etobicoke
Politicians from Toronto
People from Thunder Bay District